Kamara is a Gur language of Ghana.

References

Oti–Volta languages
Languages of Ghana